The concept of an innate language is referenced in various fields within philosophy, philosophy of language, linguistics, philosophy of mind, psycholinguistics, and other cognitive sciences.

 In philosophy, "innate language" may refer to: 
 Being - as a system of sensual and holistic "language" within the mind
 Innatism - the idea that the mind is born with knowledge (of being) and is not a "blank slate"
 In linguistics, "innate language" may refer to:
 Universal grammar - investigation into linguistic commonalities
 I-language and comprehension (linguistics)
 Language acquisition device (i.e. "brain")
 Innateness hypothesis - in language acquisition
 Language bioprogram theory
 In the cognitive sciences, 
 Language module
 Psycholinguistics
 Cognition, thought (as constituted by an "innate language")

Other 
 The Language Instinct, and Words and Rules - books by Steven Pinker
 Special:Search/Innate language - search Wikipedia for "innate language"